Adolf Schreiber (31 August 1913 – 20 August 1983) was a Liechtenstein cyclist. He competed in the individual road race event at the 1936 Summer Olympics.

References

External links
 

1913 births
1983 deaths
Liechtenstein male cyclists
Olympic cyclists of Liechtenstein
Cyclists at the 1936 Summer Olympics